Christos Aritzis, (born 11 August 1984) is a Greek footballer currently playing for Bulgarian side Vihren Sandanski. He is a central forward.

Aritzis previously played for Kalamata F.C. in the Greek Beta Ethniki.
Currently Aritzis is playing for Panaupliakos. in Nafplio in the Greek Delta Ethniki.

References

1983 births
Living people
Association football forwards
Greek footballers
Greek expatriate footballers
Expatriate footballers in Bulgaria
First Professional Football League (Bulgaria) players
Asteras Tripolis F.C. players
Kalamata F.C. players
OFC Vihren Sandanski players
Greek expatriates in Bulgaria
Footballers from Serres